In mathematics, a characterization of an object is a set of conditions that, while different from the definition of the object, is logically equivalent to it. To say that "Property P characterizes object X" is to say that not only does X have property P, but that X is the only thing that has property P (i.e., P is a defining property of X). Similarly, a set of properties P is said to characterize X, when these properties distinguish X from all other objects. Even though a characterization identifies an object in a unique way, several characterizations can exist for a single object. Common mathematical expressions for a characterization of X in terms of P include "P is necessary and sufficient for X", and "X holds if and only if P".

It is also common to find statements such as "Property Q characterizes Y up to isomorphism". The first type of statement says in different words that the extension of P is a singleton set, while the second says that the extension of Q is a single equivalence class (for isomorphism, in the given example — depending on how up to is being used, some other equivalence relation might be involved).

A reference on mathematical terminology notes that characteristic originates from the Greek term kharax, "a pointed stake":"From Greek kharax came kharakhter, an instrument used to mark or engrave an object. Once an object was marked, it became distinctive, so the character of something came to mean its distinctive nature. The Late Greek suffix -istikos converted the noun character into the adjective characteristic, which, in addition to maintaining its adjectival meaning, later became a noun as well."Just as in chemistry, the characteristic property of a material will serve to identify a sample, or in the study of materials, structures and properties will determine characterization, in mathematics there is a continual effort to express properties that will distinguish a desired feature in a theory or system. Characterization is not unique to mathematics, but since the science is abstract, much of the activity can be described as "characterization". For instance, in Mathematical Reviews, as of 2018, more than 24,000 articles contain the word in the article title, and 93,600 somewhere in the review.

In an arbitrary context of objects and features, characterizations have been expressed via the heterogeneous relation aRb, meaning that object a has feature b. For example, b may mean abstract or concrete. The objects can be considered the extensions of the world, while the features are expression of the intensions. A continuing program of characterization of various objects leads to their categorization.

Examples
 A rational number, generally defined as a ratio of two integers, can be characterized as a number with finite or repeating decimal expansion.
A parallelogram is a quadrilateral whose opposing sides are parallel. One of its characterizations is that its diagonals bisect each other. This means that the diagonals in all parallelograms bisect each other, and conversely, that any quadrilateral whose diagonals bisect each other must be a parallelogram. The latter statement is only true if inclusive definitions of quadrilaterals are used (so that, for example, rectangles count as parallelograms), which is the dominant way of defining objects in mathematics nowadays.
 "Among probability distributions on the interval from 0 to ∞ on the real line, memorylessness characterizes the exponential distributions." This statement means that the exponential distributions are the only probability distributions that are memoryless, provided that the distribution is continuous as defined above (see Characterization of probability distributions for more).
 "According to Bohr–Mollerup theorem, among all functions f such that f(1) = 1 and x f(x) = f(x + 1) for x > 0, log-convexity characterizes the gamma function."  This means that among all such functions, the gamma function is the only one that is log-convex.
 The circle is characterized as a manifold by being one-dimensional, compact and connected; here the characterization, as a smooth manifold, is up to diffeomorphism.

See also 

 Characterization of probability distributions
 Characterizations of the category of topological spaces
 Characterizations of the exponential function
 Characteristic (algebra)
 Characteristic (exponent notation)
 Classification theorem
 Euler characteristic
 Character (mathematics)

References

Mathematical terminology
Equivalence (mathematics)